Griffin High School is located in Griffin, Georgia, United States. It is part of the Griffin-Spalding County School District. The mascot of Griffin High School is the Bear. The school's colors are green and gold.  The Sam Bailey Building is part of the school and is on the National Register of Historic Places.

Notable alumni

Professional football players
 Randy Baldwin
 John Brewer
 Charlie Clemons 
 Chris Clemons
 Nic Clemons
 Stacey Driver
 Freddie Gilbert
 Willie Gault (and Olympic athlete)
 Sherrod Martin
 Alton Montgomery 
 Corey Moore
 Dwayne Morgan 
 Bobby Rainey
 Johnathan Sullivan
 Ben Talley
 Jessie Tuggle
 Xzavier Dickson 
Rayfield Wright
 Chandler Worthy

Professional baseball players
 Telvin Nash
 Tim Beckham
 Jeff Treadway
 Cornelius Randolph
 Jeremy Beckham
 Terry Fuller

Professional basketball players
 Darrin Hancock

Military 
 General Stephen Townsend

References

External links
Griffin High School Profile (2021) | Griffin, GA
Griffin-Spalding County - Ga - Griffin High
griffinhighbandofgold - Welcome to our 2010 - 2011 school year!!

Public high schools in Georgia (U.S. state)
Schools in Spalding County, Georgia
Buildings and structures in Griffin, Georgia